Statistics of Swedish football Division 3 for the 1952–53 season.

League standings

Norrländska Norra 1952–53

Norrländska Södra 1952–53

Norra 1952–53

Östra 1952–53

Västra 1952–53

Södra 1952–53

Footnotes

References 

Swedish Football Division 3 seasons
3
Swed